Kentucky Route 3600 (KY 3600) is a secondary urban state highway located entirely in Barren County, Kentucky.

Route description 
KY 3600 is the state highway designation for the western extension of the Veterans Outer Loop around the city of Glasgow, the Barren County seat. The route begins at a junction with KY 1267 and ends at a crossroad intersection with the concurrently running U.S. Route 68 (US 68) and KY 80, US 68 Business, and the pre-existing part of the outer loop on the west side of town.

History 

During late 2014 and early 2015, the purpose of construction of KY 3600 was to provide another bypass route to ease up congestion on the US 31E By-pass, the major artery through the city. The project also included a fourth interchange on the Louie B. Nunn Cumberland Parkway. The project was completed on May 28, 2015, and the grand opening took place on June 4 of that year.

Major intersections

See also

References

External links
Veterans Outer Loop - Bing News

3600
3600